Carlos Nantes Bolsonaro (born 7 December 1982) is a Brazilian politician, the second son of the 38th President of Brazil, Jair Bolsonaro.

He graduated in Aeronautical Science from Estácio de Sá University and has been a member of the Municipal Chamber of Rio de Janeiro since 2001, being affiliated to the Republicans.

His brothers are Flávio Bolsonaro, a member of the Legislative Assembly of Rio de Janeiro from 2003 until 2019 and currently member of the Federal Senate of Brazil, and Eduardo Bolsonaro, a member of the Chamber of Deputies since 2015.

In 2000, Carlos Bolsonaro was the youngest councillor elected in Brazil's history, having received 16,053 votes. In 2016, he was re-elected to a fifth term, being the most voted councillor of Rio de Janeiro with 106,657 votes.

Personal life 
In 2023, it was reported that Carlos is in a relationship with the economist and representative of Brazil at the Inter-American Development Bank (IDB), Martha Seillier. She got pregnant from this relationship and their first daughter, named Júlia, was born on February 13, 2023. She is the fourth granddaughter of the former President of Brazil, Jair Bolsonaro.

Electoral history

Municipal Chamber of Rio de Janeiro

References

External links
 

1982 births
Carlos
Conservatism in Brazil
Far-right politics in Brazil
Living people
People from Resende
Brazilian people of Italian descent
Brazilian people of Venetian descent
Brazilian people of Calabrian descent
Brazilian people of German descent
Brazilian anti-communists
Social Christian Party (Brazil) politicians
Progressistas politicians
Democrats (Brazil) politicians
Brazilian Labour Party (current) politicians
Children of presidents of Brazil